This is a list of lower houses that have been abolished.

 The Irish House of Commons was abolished in 1800.
 The House of Representatives of Fiji was abolished in 2003.
 The Legislative Assembly of British Guiana was abolished in 1964.
 The Diet of Hungary
 The House of Representatives of South Korea
 The Nebraska House of Representatives
 The National Congress of Nicaragua
 The House of Commons of Northern Ireland
 The Andra kammaren of Sweden
 The Bombay Legislative Assembly
 The Chamber of Deputies of Portugal (1910-1926)
 The Venezuelan Chamber of Deputies was abolished after elections in 1998.

See also 
 List of abolished upper houses

Lists of politics lists
Abolished